The Mitsubishi F-1 is a Japanese swept-wing, single-seat, twin-engine supersonic strike aircraft that was in service with the Japan Air Self-Defense Force (JASDF) from 1978 to 2006. It was Japan's first domestically designed and built supersonic combat aircraft, jointly developed by Mitsubishi Heavy Industries. It is essentially a T-2 trainer airframe modified for a dedicated anti-ship and ground attack role.

Design and development

In the mid 1960s, the Japan Air Self-Defense Force (JASDF) commenced studies into an advanced jet trainer which could also be modified to serve in the ground attack and anti-shipping roles.  After considering license production of the T-38 Talon and SEPECAT Jaguar, Japan decided to develop its own trainer, the supersonic Mitsubishi T-2, this first flying on 20 July 1971. Cost over-runs in the T-2 program led to the proposed single seat attack version almost being abandoned, but the cancellation of the Kawasaki P-XL, the planned replacement for Japan's Kawasaki P-2J maritime patrol aircraft freed-up funds, while making it important to keep Japan's aviation industry employed, and contracts were awarded for the development of the attack version as the FS-T2kai in 1973.

The new aircraft was a minimum change derivative of the T-2, with the rear cockpit being converted to an avionics bay by removing the rear seat, and replacing the canopy with a simple unglazed access hatch. Two additional hardpoints were fitted under the wing to allow carriage of a heavier weapon load, and the avionics were improved, with a new  J/AWG-12 radar set, similar to the AN/AWG-12 fitted in British Royal Air Force F-4M Phantom fighter jets. This set provides ranging information. Aside from the avionics changes, deletion of the rear seat, and new one-piece canopy, the only other major change from the T-2 was the strengthening of the airframe to enable it to carry a larger weapons load than the T-2. The F-1 is fitted with an internally mounted 20 mm JM61A1 Vulcan cannon with 750 rounds of ammunition. The aircraft also has seven external hardpoints for the carriage of a wide variety of stores (missiles, gun pods, etc.). The fuselage hardpoint and inboard pair of underwing hardpoints are plumbed for external fuel tanks to increase the aircraft's range. The primary weapon of the F-1 is the ASM-1 and the newer ASM-2 long-range anti-ship missile. This weapon is roughly in the class of the American AGM-84 Harpoon or French AM.39 Exocet. Other weapons carried include the all-aspect short-range heat-seeking AIM-9 Sidewinder air-to-air missile for air-to-air combat. This weapon is carried on the wingtip rails usually, but it can also be carried on the outboard underwing hardpoints for the F-1's secondary air defense role. Other air-to-ground weapons carried include rocket pods (JLAU-3/A) of 70 mm (2.75 in) size as well as bombs of 227 kg (500 lb) and 340 kg (750 lb) in size (Mk82 and M117 respectively). In addition, the Mk-82 and M117 bombs can be fitted with infrared guidance kits, turning them into precision-guided weapons that home in on heat radiation emitted from seaborne targets such as ships or other ground-based targets. When fitted with this kit, the bomb becomes known as GCS-1.

The F-1 was replaced by the F-2 (Japan/U.S. developed, based on the F-16C/D), as well as upgraded F-4EJ Kai Phantom IIs. The last six active F-1s, based at Tsuiki in Fukuoka Prefecture, were retired on 9 March 2006, having reached the 4,000 hour limit of their airframes.

Variants
FS-T2-Kai: The first two prototypes.
Mitsubishi F-1: Single-seat close air support, ground-attack and anti-ship fighter aircraft.

Operators
: Japan Air Self-Defense Force

Survivors / Aircraft on display

 60-8275 F-1 Fuchū Air Base, in Fuchu, Tokyo
 70-8207 F-1 Mitsu Seiki Co., Ltd. Taga Works, Awaji, Hyōgo
 F-1 JASDF Kamo sub-base, Oga, Akita Prefecture
 F-1 (nose section) Misawa Air Base, Misawa, Aomori Prefecture
 F-1 Misawa Aviation & Science Museum, Misawa, Aomori Prefecture
 F-1 (fire training) Ashiya Air Field, Ashiya, Fukuoka Prefecture
 F-1 Kasuga Air Base, Kasuga, Fukuoka Prefecture
 F-1 Tsuiki Air Field, Tsuiki, Fukuoka Prefecture
 F-1 JASDF Erimo sub-base, Erimo, Hokkaido Prefecture
 F-1 Hyakuri Airport, Omitama, Ibaraki Prefecture
 F-1 National Defense Academy of Japan, Yokosuka, Kanagawa Prefecture
 F-1 JASDF Sado sub-base, Sado, Niigata Prefecture
 F-1 Iruma Air Base, Sayama, Saitama Prefecture
 F-1 Ōtsu JGSDF base, Ōtsu, Shiga Prefecture
 F-1 (Nose section) Fujisan Juku no Mori Park, Airfield cafe, Gotemba, Shizuoka Prefecture
 F-1 Harada collection Oyama, Shizuoka Prefecture
 F-1 U.S.-Japan Joint Air Defense Command HQ, Yokota Air Base, Fussa, Tokyo
 F-1 Hōfu Kita Air Base, Hōfu, Yamaguchi Prefecture

Specifications (F-1)

See also

References

Notes

Bibliography

 
Lake, Jon. "Mitsubishi F-1: Ship-killing Samurai". World Air Power Journal, Volume 23, Winter 1995. London:Aerospace Publishing. . ISSN 0959-7050. pp. 50–71.
Michell, Simon (editor). Jane's Civil and Military Aircraft Upgrades 1994-95. Coulsdon, UK: Jane's Information Group, 1994. .
Sekigawa, Eiichiro. "Mitsubishi's Sabre Successor". Air International, March 1980, Vol 18 No 3. Bromley, UK:Fine Scroll. ISSN 0306-5634. pp. 117–121, 130–131.

External links

F-1 at Globalsecurity.org
F-1 at Tower Hobbies

F-1, Mitsubishi
F-1
High-wing aircraft
Twinjets
Aircraft first flown in 1975